Akanksha Sahai (born 28 October 1988) is an Indian athlete that is chosen to compete in the 2009 Asian Indoor Games and the first World Vovinam Championship. In the dual sword form event of the Indoor Games, Pratiksha Santosh Shinde and Akanksha Sahai got India a silver medal. It's also Pratiksha's third silver coming in fights category.

In the World Vovinam Championship, she is ranked number 3.

Early life 
Akanksha is a student at University of Delhi, who majors in Commerce and a Masters from Lancaster University in International Business. Together with her father, Vishnu Sahai, who is a doctor and a peer, she makes vovinam popular in the whole India. She helps him a lot to communicate with people, organise and acts as an athlete. Among the Indian athletes, she is the only one that is considered to be able to serve as a judge.

References

External links 
 VAIGOC 2009 Official site, athlete info
 Official site at Ho Chi Minh City

1988 births
Living people
Indian female martial artists
21st-century Indian women
21st-century Indian people